Oliver Ames Sr., or "Old Oliver", (April 11, 1779 – September 11, 1863) was the family patriarch of the Ames family of Easton, Massachusetts. He established the family shovel business, which over generations grew to become one of the largest family fortunes in New England.

Biography
Oliver Ames Sr. was born April 11, 1779 to Capt. John Ames and Susannah Howard, in West Bridgewater, Massachusetts. His father was a blacksmith who provided guns for the Revolutionary army, and made a name for himself making shovels of high quality.

Oliver began his career in Springfield, working for his elder brother David at the newly established Springfield Armory. David, a gunsmith like their father, was appointed by George Washington as the armory's first superintendent. In 1802, David's term ended and Oliver returned to Bridgewater.

Ames moved to Easton, Massachusetts in 1803 and bought a nail-making business, and converted it into a shovel factory. This factory eventually grew into the Ames Shovel Works, a major business in Easton, and the source a great family fortune.

From 1807-1814, Ames supervised the shovel-making plant at Plymouth Iron Works, but returned to his own shop in Easton, where business slowly grew. In 1844, Ames turned the business over to his sons Oakes Ames and Oliver Ames Jr., and renamed the firm Oliver Ames & Sons. Ames gave each of his sons one-quarter interest in the company, retaining a third for himself.

Ames died at North Easton, Massachusetts on September 11, 1863.

Politics
Ames was a member of the Massachusetts House of Representatives from 1828-1829 and again 1833-34, and served as state senator in 1845.

Religion
Ames was an active Unitarian, and helped establish the Unitarian society in Easton.

Family
Ames married Susannah Angier, daughter of Oakes Angier, a prominent lawyer, in April 1803. Ames was said to be fond of wrestling and feats of strength.

Ames died in Easton on September 11, 1863. On his death, his sons Oakes and Oliver took over the Shovel Works with grandson Frederick Lothrop Ames.

References

External links
Who Were the Ames

See also
 Oliver Ames Jr.
 Oakes Ames
 Ames Shovel Shop
 Ames True Temper
 Frederick Lothrop Ames
 Frederick Lothrop Ames Jr.

1779 births
1863 deaths
Butler–Ames family
American Unitarians
People from Easton, Massachusetts
Massachusetts state senators
Businesspeople from Massachusetts
19th-century American businesspeople
People from West Bridgewater, Massachusetts